Carsten Nagel (born 1955 in Copenhagen) is a Danish author of 12 published books, including novels and short story collections, plus a feature-length film, short film and a play to his credit.

Nagel has been described as a Nordic mix of Jean Genet and Henry Miller. His writing is known for its sparkling language, where pain and joy are natural twins. Although his books often have a serious existential focus, a devilish sense of humor is perhaps his most well-known trademark. Besides being a prolific writer, Carsten Nagel is a clinical psychologist, working with refugees who have suffered trauma and torture.

Works
None of Carsten Nagel's books have been translated into English. The English titles below are thus not official, and subject to change if and when his works are published in English.
1976: Som man(d) behager (As You Like It).
1977: Mandens sidste nat (The Man's Last Night).
1977: Nøgen (Naked).
1978: Liv & død. (Life & Death) (Co-writers Wam & Vennerød)  -Movie-.
1979: Passionsfrugter (Passion Fruits).
1980: Æbleslottet (The Big Apple Castle).
1982: Knock-Out (Knock Out).
1983: Hjertestrimler (Heart Shreds).
1986: Hunger (Hunger).
1987: Ikke et ord om AIDS (Not A Word About AIDS)  - A feature film-.
1987: Dødforelsket (Deadly In Love)  -A Play-.
1991: Dødforelsket (Deadly In Love)  -Printed edition-.
1992: Stuefugle i farver (Caged Birds).
1996: Lejerne (The Tenants).
2009: Zehras flugt (Zehra's Flight).

Anthologies
1978: Kærlighedens stjernetræ (The Love Tree).
1990: Elsk lidt mere – sagde døden (Love A Little More - Said Death).
1991: Saft (Juices).
1993: Skud (Shots).
1998: Horisontale historier (Horizontal Stories).
2003: Når mænd elsker mænd og kvinder elsker kvinder (When Men Love Men And Women Love  Women).

Website (in Danish)
http://www.carstennagel.dk/ carstennagel.dk

Summary and excerpt of Zehra's Flight in English.

1955 births
Living people
20th-century Danish dramatists and playwrights
Danish male short story writers
Danish male screenwriters
Danish psychologists
Danish male novelists
Danish male dramatists and playwrights
20th-century Danish novelists
20th-century Danish male writers